The following is a list of villages in Ukraine's Kharkiv Oblast, categorised by raion.

Bohodukhiv Raion 

 Parkhomivka
 Pasichne
 Skoryky
 Udy

Chuhuiv Raion 

 Bazaliivka
 Birky
 Borova
 Khotimlya
 Kluhyno-Bashkyrivka
 Kostiantivka
 Lebyazhe
 Mala Seidemynukha
 Molodova
 Rubizhne
 Shestakove
 Velyka Babka
 Zemlianky

Izium Raion 

 Bairak
 Bohuslavka
 Borivska-Andriyivka
 Borshchivka
 Brazhkivka
 Donetske
 Dovhenke
 Husarivka, Balakliia hromada
 Husarivka, Barvinkove hromada
 Iziumske
 Nova Husarivka
 Novoplatonivka
 Oskil
 Pisky-Radkivski
 Protopopivka
 Studenok
 Velyka Komshuvakha
 Virnopillya
 Zelenyi Hai

Kharkiv Raion 

 Bezruky
 Cherkaski Tyshky
 Hoptivka
 Lyptsi
 Mala Rohan
 Male Vesele
 Peremoha
 Ruska Lozova
 Ruski Tyshky
 Ternova
 Tsyrkuny
 Vilkhivka
 Zatyshne
 Zavody

Lozova Raion 

 Lozivske
 Zelenyi Hai

Kupiansk Raion 

 Hrianykivka
 Kurylivka
 Petropavlivka
 Tavilzhanka
 Zatyshne
 Zelenyi Hai

Krasnohrad Raion 

 Zemlianky

Villages in Kharkiv Oblast
Kharkiv